J. H. Williams may refer to:

 J. H. Williams III, American comic artist
 Jim Williams (politician) (1926–2016), American politician
 Lt. Col. J.H. Williams, British author of Elephant Bill (1950) 
 John Harry Williams (1908–1966), Canadian-American physicist
 J.H. Williams Tool Group, American tool manufacturer

See also
 Williams (surname)